Bunty Lawless (1935–1956) was a Canadian Thoroughbred racehorse who in 1951 was voted Canada's "Horse of the Half-Century".

Racing career
Racing during the Great Depression of the 1930s, Bunty Lawless competed for purse money that was very small. At age two, he finished first or second in all but one of his ten races. The one time he was out of the money that year was in the Cup and Saucer Stakes, when his equipment broke. In 1938, the horse was the top 3-year-old in Canada, and his victory in the King's Plate, his country's most prestigious race, was enormously popular with the public. In an era when millionaires still dominated Thoroughbred horse racing, the owner and breeder of Bunty Lawless was the opposite. The working man's hero, Willie Morrissey grew up penniless in the poorest section of Toronto, worked as a newsboy, then became a successful hotel owner and boxing promoter. At the race track, he sat in the cheap grandstand seats with the rest of the crowd and was frowned upon by the aristocratic elite owners in their top hats and tails, seated in their exclusive viewing boxes.

After winning the King's Plate, Bunty Lawless ran second to future Hall of Fame inductee Mona Bell in the 1938 Breeders' Stakes, then won the Canadian Championship Stakes. Taken south of the border, he won the August 20th Bennington Handicap at Saratoga Race Course.

Stud record
Retired to stud, Bunty Lawless proved an exceptional sire and was Canada's leading sire four times. His offspring includes 1949 King's Plate winner Epic and 1946 Breeders' Stakes winner Windfields, for whom E. P. Taylor named his famous farm. Bunty Lawless is also the grandsire of Mint Copy, the dam of Deputy Minister, who became an influential sire whose descendants include the famed fillies Open Mind (winner of the 1988 Breeders' Cup Juvenile Fillies and 1989 Triple Tiara) and Go For Wand (winner of the 1989 Breeders' Cup Juvenile Fillies).  His other descendants include Canadian Horse of the Year and Hall of Fame inductee Victoria Park.

Pedigree

References

1935 racehorse births
1956 racehorse deaths
Racehorses bred in Ontario
Racehorses trained in Canada
King's Plate winners
Canadian Horse Racing Hall of Fame inductees
Thoroughbred family 23-b
Godolphin Arabian sire line